Airspeed is the speed of an aircraft relative to the air.

Airspeed may also refer to:

Specific measures of airspeed
Calibrated airspeed (CAS), indicated airspeed, corrected for instrument error and position error
Equivalent airspeed (EAS), the airspeed at sea level which represents the same dynamic pressure as that flying at the true airspeed at altitude
Indicated airspeed (IAS), the airspeed read directly from the airspeed indicator on an aircraft
True airspeed (TAS), the speed of an aircraft relative to the airmass in which it flies

Other uses in aviation
Air-Speed Inc, a defunct American airline
Airspeed indicator, a flight instrument that displays airspeed
Airspeed Ltd., a British aircraft manufacturer

Meteorology
Windspeed, the speed of the air currents

Other uses
Air speed (HVAC)
Airspeed (film), a 1998 Canadian film
Air Speed, a discount skateboard shoe brand sold by Wal-Mart and endorsed by skateboarder Mike McGill

See also

 
 
 
 
 
 Speed (disambiguation)
 Air (disambiguation)